Asociación Deportiva Centenario, commonly referred as Centenario de Neuquén, is an Argentine sports club based in the city of Centenario, in Neuquén Province. The club has a football team that currently plays in the Torneo Argentino C, the regionalized fifth division of Argentine football league system.
Also is the only team with most kit sponsors, in front and back has a total of 32.

Centenario has also a competitive volleyball team known as Gigantes del Sur (in English: Giants of the South) that plays in the top division of Argentine volleyball, the Serie A1.

Titles
Liga de Fútbol de Neuquén: 5
 1989, 1991, Clausura 1999, Apertura 2002, Apertura 2014

C
C
C
C